Myricaria is a genus of flowering plants of the family Tamaricaceae, native to Eurasia.

Species
Species considered valid by The Plant List are as follows: 
Myricaria albiflora Grierson & D.G. Long 
Myricaria davurica (Willd.) Ehrenb. 
Myricaria elegans Royle 
Myricaria germanica (L.) Desv. 
Myricaria laxa W.W. Sm. 
Myricaria laxiflora (Franch.) P.Y. Zhang & Y.J. Zhang 
Myricaria paniculata P.Y. Zhang & Y.J. Zhang 
Myricaria platyphylla Maxim. 
Myricaria prostrata Hook. f. & Thomson 
Myricaria pulcherrima Batalin 
Myricaria rosea W.W. Sm. 
Myricaria wardii C. Marquand

References

Caryophyllales genera
Tamaricaceae